Poland is a country located in Central Europe, situated between the Baltic Sea in the north and two mountain ranges (the Sudetes and Carpathian Mountains) in the south. Since the fall of communism many major companies have been established in Poland. The following list includes both fully Polish companies and foreign owned firms with independent Polish operations, such as Fiat Poland. Most of Poland's economy since communism has been developed by small and medium businesses, but large corporations still control aspects of heavy industry, mining, and chemical refining.

For further information on the types of business entities in this country and their abbreviations, see "Business entities in Poland".

Notable firms 
This list includes notable companies with primary headquarters located in the country. The industry and sector follow the Industry Classification Benchmark taxonomy. Organizations which have ceased operations are included and noted as defunct.

See also 
 Economy of Poland
List of largest Polish companies
 List of mines in Poland

References 

Poland